When Fate Decides  is a lost 1919 American silent drama film directed by Harry Millarde and starring Madlaine Traverse. It was produced and distributed by Fox Film Corporation.

Cast
Madlaine Traverse as Vera Loudon
William Conklin as Herbert Loudon
Clyde Fillmore as Donald Cavendish
Claire Du Brey as Alicia Carteret
Henry Hebert as Harry Carteret (credited as Henry J. Herbert)
John Cossar as Egan
Genevieve Blinn as Mrs. Veriker
Cordelia Callahan as Mathilde

See also
1937 Fox vault fire

References

External links

1919 films
American silent feature films
Fox Film films
Lost American films
Films directed by Harry F. Millarde
American black-and-white films
Silent American drama films
1919 drama films
1919 lost films
Lost drama films
1910s American films